Zandazenkosi Dumisle Opeyemi Adebayo Siziba (born 19 July 2003) is a footballer who plays as a midfielder for  club Ipswich Town.

Career
After playing for Dagenham & Redbridge and Tottenham Hotspur at youth level, he joined Ipswich Town on a two-year scholarship in 2019.

He made his senior debut for Ipswich Town on 6 October 2020 as a substitute in a 2–0 EFL Trophy victory over Gillingham, before making his full debut against Crawley Town in the EFL Trophy the following month.

On 6 July 2021, Siziba signed his first professional contract with Ipswich, signing a two-year deal with the option of an additional one-year extension.

Style of play
Siziba usually plays as a winger but can also play as a deep-lying playmaker. He is right-footed with his style of play having been positively compared to that of Liverpool winger Sadio Mane.

Personal life
He is Zimbabwean.

Career statistics

References

External links
 
 

2003 births
Living people
Zimbabwean footballers
Association football midfielders
Ipswich Town F.C. players